The Jean Nicod Prize is awarded annually in Paris to a leading philosopher of mind or philosophically oriented cognitive scientist. The lectures are organized by the Centre National de la Recherche Scientifique as part of its effort to promote interdisciplinary research in cognitive science in France. The 1993 lectures marked the centenary of the birth of the French philosopher and logician Jean Nicod (1893–1924). Besides the CNRS, sponsors include the École Normale Supérieure and the School for Advanced Studies in the Social Sciences. The Jean Nicod lecturer is expected to deliver at least four lectures on a topic of his or her choice, and subsequently to publish the set of lectures, or a monograph based on them in the Jean Nicod Lectures series (MIT Press/Bradford Books; F. Recanati editor).

List
List of Jean Nicod Prize laureates from 1993 to the present day:

(Source: Institut Jean Nicod)

See also

 Institut Jean Nicod
 List of awards named after people
 List of cognitive scientists
 List of social sciences awards
 List of philosophy awards
 List of psychology awards
 Philosophy of psychology

References

External links
 Jean Nicod Prize & Lectures
 MIT Press: Jean Nicod Lectures Series

French National Centre for Scientific Research awards
Cognitive science awards

Philosophy awards